The 189th Aviation Regiment is an aviation regiment of the U.S. Army. It was probably formed in the late 1980s.

The 1st Battalion is part of the 34th Infantry Division, and administratively supervised while under state control by the 95th Troop Command of the Montana Army National Guard.

Structure
 1st Battalion (General Support)
 Company B (CH-47F) at Army Aviation Support Facility, Reno Stead Airport (NV ARNG)
 Company C (UH-60M)
 Company F (MN ARNG)
 Company G (UH-60M) (OR ARNG)
 Detachment 1 (HI ARNG) at Army Aviation Support Facility #1 at Kaneohe Airfield

References

External links

189
Military units and formations established in the 1980s